Richard Veenstra (born 10 July 1981) is a Dutch professional darts player who currently plays in Professional Darts Corporation (PDC) events. He is a Dutch Open champion, BDO World Trophy and Finder Darts Masters finalist. Multiple medalist of WDF World Cup and WDF Europe Cup.

Career
In October 2014, Veenstra won the Luxembourg Open beating Mark Oosterhuis in the Final 6–4. He reached the semi-finals of the 2015 Denmark Masters and England Open. In October 2015, he won WDF World Cup Pairs with Wesley Harms to beat Scott Mitchell and Mark McGeeney 6–3. On his debut at the 2016 BDO World Darts Championship, Veenstra caused an upset beating compatriot and third seed Jeffrey de Graaf 3–2 in the first round, before beating English player Martin Atkins comfortably 4–0 in the second round. Veenstra then defeated defending champion Scott Mitchell 5-3 to reach the semi-finals, which he narrowly lost to Jeff Smith 6-5.

In September 2016, Veenstra won the WDF Europe Cup singles, He beat Jim Williams in the final 7-5 averaging 93.18. In September 2018, he won both the BDO British Open and BDO British Classic in the same weekend.

Veenstra has announced that he intends to compete for a tour card at the 2020 PDC Q School. In the Last 16 of the 2022 he recorded the highest three dart average in the venue's history with 104.91. In the Quarter Final he almost achieved a perfect 9 dart finish playing against Brian Raman but sadly missed double 12.

PDC
On day four of the 2023 Q school although he did not win a outright tour card, he did manage to obtain a good number of points to secure a tour card and will play on the PDC circuit for 2023 and 2024 seasons.

World Championship results

BDO/WDF
 2016: Semi-finals (lost to Jeff Smith 5–6)
 2017: Second round (lost to Danny Noppert 0–4)
 2018: Quarter-finals (lost to Michael Unterbuchner 4–5)
 2019: Second round (lost to Scott Waites 1–4)
 2020: Second round (lost to David Evans 2–4)
 2022: Semi-finals (lost to Neil Duff 2–5)

Career finals

BDO major finals: 2 (2 runner-up)

Performance timeline

PDC European Tour

References

External links
Richard Veenstra's profile and stats on Darts Database

1981 births
Living people
Dutch darts players
British Darts Organisation players
Professional Darts Corporation current tour card holders
People from Steenwijkerland
Sportspeople from Overijssel
21st-century Dutch people